In mathematics, the Riemann zeta function is a function in complex analysis, which is also important in number theory. It is often denoted  and is named after the mathematician Bernhard Riemann. When the argument  is a real number greater than one, the zeta function satisfies the equation

This article lists these formulae, together with tables of values. It also includes derivatives and some series composed of the zeta function at integer arguments.

The complex derivative exists in this more general region, making the zeta function a meromorphic function.

The Riemann zeta function article includes a colour plot illustrating how the function varies over a continuous rectangular region of the complex plane. The successful characterisation of its non-trivial zeros in the wider plane is important in number theory, because of the Riemann hypothesis.

The Riemann zeta function at 0 and 1
At zero, one has

At 1 there is a pole, so ζ(1) is not finite but the left and right limits are:

Since it is a pole of first order, it has a complex residue

Positive integers

Even positive integers
For the even positive integers , one has the relationship to the Bernoulli numbers:

The computation of ζ(2) is known as the Basel problem. The value of ζ(4) is related to the Stefan–Boltzmann law and Wien approximation in physics. The first few values are given by:

Taking the limit , one obtains .

The relationship between zeta at the positive even integers and the Bernoulli numbers may be written as

Some of these values are reproduced below:

then we find recursively,

This recurrence relation may be derived from that for the Bernoulli numbers.

Also, there is another recurrence:

which can be proved, using that 

The values of the zeta function at non-negative even integers have the generating function:

Since 
 

Odd positive integers
The sum of the harmonic series is infinite.

The value  is also known as Apéry's constant and has a role in the electron's gyromagnetic ratio.
The value  also appears in Planck's law.
These and additional values are:

It is known that  is irrational (Apéry's theorem) and that infinitely many of the numbers , are irrational.

The positive odd integers of the zeta function appear in physics, specifically correlation functions of antiferromagnetic XXX spin chain.

Most of the identities following below are provided by Simon Plouffe. They are notable in that they converge quite rapidly, giving almost three digits of precision per iteration, and are thus useful for high-precision calculations.

Plouffe gives the following identities:

ζ(5)

ζ(7)

Note that the sum is in the form of a Lambert series.

ζ(2n + 1)
By defining the quantities

a series of relationships can be given in the form

where An, Bn, Cn and Dn are positive integers. Plouffe gives a table of values:

These integer constants may be expressed as sums over Bernoulli numbers, as given in (Vepstas, 2006) below.
 
A fast algorithm for the calculation of Riemann's zeta function for any integer argument is given by E. A. Karatsuba.

Negative integers
In general, for negative integers (and also zero), one has

The so-called "trivial zeros" occur at the negative even integers:

 (Ramanujan summation)

The first few values for negative odd integers are

However, just like the Bernoulli numbers, these do not stay small for increasingly negative odd values. For details on the first value, see 1 + 2 + 3 + 4 + · · ·.

So ζ(m) can be used as the definition of all (including those for index 0 and 1) Bernoulli numbers.

Derivatives
The derivative of the zeta function at the negative even integers is given by

The first few values of which are

One also has

where A is the Glaisher–Kinkelin constant.

From the logarithmic derivative of the functional equation,

Series involving ζ(n)
The following sums can be derived from the generating function:

where  is the digamma function.

Series related to the Euler–Mascheroni constant (denoted by ) are

and using the principal value 

which of course affects only the value at 1, these formulae can be stated as

and show that they depend on the principal value of

Nontrivial zeros 

Zeros of the Riemann zeta except negative even integers are called "nontrivial zeros". The Riemann hypothesis states that the real part of every nontrivial zero must be . In other words, all known nontrivial zeros of the Riemann zeta are of the form  where y is a real number. The following table contains the decimal expansion of Im(z) for the first few nontrivial zeros:

Andrew Odlyzko computed the first 2 million nontrivial zeros accurate to within 4, and the first 100 zeros accurate within 1000 decimal places. See their website for the tables and bibliographies.

Ratios 
Although evaluating particular values of the zeta function is difficult, often certain ratios can be found by inserting particular values of the gamma function into the functional equation

We have simple relations for half-integer arguments

Other examples follow for more complicated evaluations and relations of the gamma function.  For example a consequence of the relation

is the zeta ratio relation

where AGM is the arithmetic–geometric mean.  In a similar vein, it is possible to form radical relations, such as from

the analogous zeta relation is

References

Further reading
 
 Simon Plouffe, "Identities inspired from Ramanujan Notebooks ", (1998).
 Simon Plouffe, "Identities inspired by Ramanujan Notebooks part 2 PDF " (2006).
 
  PDF PDF Russian PS Russian
 Nontrival zeros reference by Andrew Odlyzko:
 Bibliography
 Tables

Mathematical constants
Zeta and L-functions
Irrational numbers